SK Blāzma is a Latvian football club located in Rēzekne. The club is a continuation of the city's main football club, Dižvanagi. The club competed in Virslīga in the 2008 season following promotion from the 1. Liga in 2007.

History 
The first club from Rēzekne to compete in the Latvian football championship in 1950 was Dynamo  who finished in 14th place out of 17 clubs. The following season the championship was reorganized and Dynamo club lost its place in the league. Dynamo again played in the Latvian Football Championship in 1952 but finished 9th out of 11 clubs and were relegated once again. In 1956, the club played in the championship, this time though under the name Rezekne. They finished in 8th place out of 14 clubs. Rēzekne were relegated again in the 1958 season. They were promoted again in 1960, but stayed only one season, finishing 10th.

In 1965, the club returned to the Latvian Championship, this time under the name, Mašīnbūvētājs. However, they finished the season on just two points and were relegated. From 1976 to 1978 Mašīnbūvētājs again played in the Latvian top flight, finishing in last place in 1978 and being relegated again. In 1981 and 1985 Mašīnbūvētājs again played in the top flight but each time were relegated after just one season. They were promoted again though and in 1987 and 1988 managed to avoid relegation. In 1989, with a new name, Torpedo, they finished in 8th place out of 17 clubs. In 1990 under the name Latgale they finished in 3rd place, the best finish for the club in its history. However, they did not compete in the 1991 championship.

From 1992 until 1996 under the name Vairogs the club played in the Virslīga finishing 5th in 1994 and reaching the Latvian Cup semi-finals in the same year. In 1997, the club's name was changed again, this time to FK Rēzekne but the results got worse and the club were relegated from the Virslīga in 1999. FK Rēzekne spent several years in the 1. Liga barely holding its place in the second highest division of Latvian football. The situation started to improve in 2002 and FK Rēzekne became RSK Dižvanagi and results started to improve with the league position in the 1. Liga also started to improve. Edgars Gauračs played for the Latvian national U-17 team. In 2004, the club finished 3rd in the 1. Liga, missing out on promotion to FK Zibens and FK Venta. In 2005 however they were promoted to the Virslīga as 1. Liga champions, beating FC Ditton by a single point.

In 2006 Dižvanagi Rēzekne debuted in the Virslīga. The results, however, were poor and they finished the season with just two points. There were positive signs and results though, the stands in the Rēzekne stadium were rebuilt, the club held champions FK Liepājas Metalurgs to a 0–0 draw at home and they beat FK Jūrmala 3–1 in the Latvian Cup, and reached the semi-final of the cup. Edgars Gauračs though left for Italy with Serie A side Ascoli Calcio 1898.

In 2007 under the name SK Blāzma the club played in the 1. līga, finishing second, just one point behind the champions FK Vindava Ventspils and were promoted to the Virslīga for the 2008 season. Dižvanagi Rēzekne are now the reserve team of SK Blāzma under the name Dižvanagi-2 and they compete in the Latgales zona of the 2.līga.

League and Cup history

Latvian SSR 
Dynamo

Rezekne

Mašīnbūvētājs

Torpedo

Latgale

Straumala

Latvia 

Vairogs

FK Rēzekne

SK Dižvanagi

SK Blāzma

Current squad 

 (captain)

For recent squad changes see: List of Latvian football transfers winter 2010-2011.

Managers 
Figures correct as of September 30, 2009.
 Žanis Ārmanis (January 2005 – August 2006)
 Nikolai Yuzhanin (August 2006 – December 2007)
 Jurijs Popkovs (December 2007 – August 2008)
 Žanis Ārmanis (August 2008 – July 2010)
 Eriks Grigjans (July 2010–)

External links 
 Fan Club's site of SK "Blāzma" 
 

 
Rēzekne
Football clubs in Latvia
Association football clubs established in 2004
2004 establishments in Latvia